George Shapiro (May 18, 1931 – May 26, 2022) was an American talent manager and television producer. He was among the most successful managers in show business in the United States, best known for representing Jerry Seinfeld, Carl Reiner and Andy Kaufman, and served as a producer for the sitcom Seinfeld.

Early life and education
Shapiro was born in the Bronx on May 18, 1931 to Sylvia (Lebost) Shapiro and Ira.  His father worked as a furrier and his mother was a social activist. He first met his future business partner, Howard West, in the third grade.   When Shapiro was 12, Carl Reiner married Shapiro's aunt, Estelle Lebost, and became his uncle. He attended P.S. 80, DeWitt Clinton High School, before studying at New York University (NYU).

Career
After completing his postgraduate studies from NYU in 1953, he worked in the United States Army for two years. Then Shapiro went to work in the mailroom at the William Morris Agency in New York. He advanced within the company and soon became an agent. One of his first assignments was to accompany Elvis Presley during his appearances on The Ed Sullivan Show. Eventually, he began packaging programs, including the hits The Steve Allen Show, That Girl starring Marlo Thomas, and Gomer Pyle starring Jim Nabors. He also packaged a number of specials for Dick Van Dyke, Mary Tyler Moore and Carol Channing.

Shapiro left William Morris to become a personal manager and producer along with his partner and friend, Howard West. They formed Shapiro/West Productions and executive produced the Emmy-, Peabody-, and Golden Globe award-winning series, Seinfeld. Shapiro was Andy Kaufman's personal manager for many years, executive producing the Showtime special, Andy Kaufman at Carnegie Hall, and The Andy Kaufman Show on ABC. He was executive producer with West on the 1999 Universal biopic Man on the Moon, starring Jim Carrey in the role of Andy Kaufman and Danny DeVito as Shapiro, and had a cameo in the movie as Mr. Besserman. He played a prominent role in the documentary Comedian.

On June 30, 2012, people from the world of comedy gathered at the Beverly Wilshire Hotel in Beverly Hills to honor Shapiro. The David Lynch Foundation presented him with the first Lifetime of Bliss Award. He said he had been practicing Transcendental Meditation for 28 years.

Personal life
Shapiro was married to Melody until his death. Together, they had three children: Danny, Carrie, and Stefanie.

Shapiro died of natural causes on May 26, 2022, at his home in Beverly Hills, aged 91.

Filmography

As a producer

As an actor

Awards and nominations 
Primetime Emmy Awards

References

External links
 
 

1931 births
2022 deaths
People from the Bronx
American talent agents
American television producers
20th-century American Jews
New York University alumni
21st-century American Jews